Kistler Valley is the name of two locations; one is in Antarctica, and the other is in Berks County, Pennsylvania, United States.

Antarctica 
Kistler Valley is located in the east-central Dufek Massif, Pensacola Mountains, Antarctica and is a mostly ice-filled valley. The valley lies between the Sapp Rocks and Forlidas Ridge and heads in the amphitheatre between Nutt Bluff and Preslik Spur. It was named after Ronald W. Kistler, a retired Research Geologist, formerly with the United States Geological Survey. His laboratory research and scientific reporting with A.B. Ford (1979–2000) on the geochronology and petrology of the Dufek intrusion of the northern Pensacola Mountains was critical for the understanding of the evolution of this major igneous complex.

Pennsylvania 
A second location also uses this same name in Berks County, Pennsylvania, United States.

References

Valleys of Queen Elizabeth Land